Clearwater Aerodrome  is a private airfield run by the Irving Oil company in Clearwater, New Brunswick, Canada.

References

External links
Page about this airport on COPA's Places to Fly airport directory

Registered aerodromes in New Brunswick
Transport in York County, New Brunswick
Buildings and structures in York County, New Brunswick